Dato' Seri Haji Muhammad Sanusi bin Md Nor (born 4 August 1974) is a Malaysian politician who has served as the 14th Menteri Besar of Kedah since May 2020 and Member of the Kedah State Legislative Assembly (MLA) for Jeneri since May 2018 and was the Leader of the Opposition of the state from July 2018 to the collapse of the Pakatan Harapan state administration led by his predecessor Mukhriz Mahathir in May 2020. A member of the Malaysian Islamic Party (PAS), he is the party's Deputy Commissioner I of the state.

Early life and education
Muhammad Sanusi was born in Sik, Kedah, Malaysia and he is the seventh child among 13 siblings from the marriage of Md Nor Taib (born 1942) and Meriam Ahmad (born 1949).

He received his primary education at Sekolah Rendah Batu 5, Sik and later his secondary education in Sekolah Menengah Derma, Kangar, Perlis and Sekolah Menengah Sains Sultan Mohamad Jiwa, Sungai Petani. He received his Bachelor of Arts from Universiti Sains Malaysia (USM), Gelugor, Penang.

Political career
 PAS Election Director
 Chairman of PASRelief
 Central Director-General of PAS Security (2017 to date)
 PAS Divisional Commissioner of Sik, Kedah (2015 to date)
 Kedah PAS Deputy Commissioner (2015 to date)
 Political Secretary to 10th Menteri Besar of Kedah Tan Sri Dato' Seri Diraja Ustaz Hj Azizan Abdul Razak (2008 to 2013)
 14th Menteri Besar of Kedah

Controversies and issues

Rare-earth metal deposits 
In Early December 2020, Muhammad Sanusi Md Nor announced that the Kedah state government had awarded a Kuala Lumpur-based company a permit to prospect and extract RM 43 Trillion worth of rare earth metals. Upon further investigation, it was found that the rare earth element deposits were only worth an estimated RM 62 Billion. The DAP have claimed that Muhammad Sanusi Md Nor is intentionally courting controversies and being provocative to draw attention away from the rare-earth element deposit controversy.

Racism incidents

Alcoholism remarks 
Muhammad Sanusi has been accused by the media for his alleged derogatory statements against minority communities (Indians), which linked them with alcoholism. He had said that the opposition were "drunk on the toddy of popularity" in his speeches without any reference to any community. Following this the minorities protested and called for him to apologize publicly which have the effect of linking alcoholism with certain community themselves. However, Sanusi avoided apologizing and instead called for a ban on the Malaysian Indian Congress Party which caused the chairman of MIC, Tan Sri Vigneswaran to comment that "this is what happens when you pick an ignorant man to be [an] MB".

Hindu Temple Demolishing 

Muhammad Sanusi administration enforced the law involving demolition of illegally constructed Hindu temples despite protests from the Indian community. It became a nationwide issue as the administration stance has caused many political leaders, religious leaders and NGO representatives to criticise his actions as insensitive towards Hindus. The DAP suggested that the actual aim of the push for the demolition of temples was to distract from the earlier controversy around the rare earth deposits. Others however supported Sanusi's act on the demolition of the Hindu temples. The Coalitions of Hindu NGOs has requested him to stop the demolition and apologize else to bring the matter to the attention of the Palace through a reactive press conference. Through the press conference, the coalition representatives requested Sanusi to guarantee that the demolitions will stop immediately, however Sanusi responded that everything was happening under the purview of law. Participants of the press conference urged the government to be more proactive and remain sensitive and prepare an ecosystem to secure to the rights of the Hindu community in Malaysia. It was noted that UMHV is also prepared to work hands-on with the government to find a permanent solution for the issues faced by the Hindu temples and communities.

Football racism remarks
During a press conference of Malaysian football club Kedah FA, Muhammad Sanusi acting as the president of the club made racial remarks of its foreign players, by referring to them as 'Awang Hitam' which translates as 'black man' (the word Awang means a man in Malay). In addition, it was also considered one of the derogatory terms used by certain dailies to identify African men.

Thaipusam holiday
On 21 January 2021, Sanusi said the Thaipusam festival would not be marked as a public holiday since there is no celebration of the annual festival for the year given the spike in Covid-19 cases, and all public gatherings will be barred. He said the state would allow state assemblyman service centres to operate via drive-through services for the people in their respective constituencies. However, only one-third of devotees will be allowed to pray at temples during the festival.

The MCA has also described Sanusi's decision as illogical and disrespectful of the country's minorities' rights. The MIC deputy president Datuk Seri M. Saravanan said the decision sends a negative signal about PAS to all minorities in the country. "He has planted the seed of fear in the minds of all minorities," said Vell Paari. The former MIC secretary-general said PAS central leadership tried its best to portray the party as being inclusive. He also criticised PAS for saying that MIC did not support PAS during the 14th General Election (GE14) in 2018. He reminded Sanusi that during GE14, PAS was not a component of the Barisan Nasional.

Arrests of critics and COVID19 Corpse Joke
In August 2021, four people were arrested for allegedly insulting Sanusi over his "joke" on the freezer containers to hold corpses of COVID-19 victims. The first arrest was made on a 61-year old senior citizen who was detained at his house at 3:57am in Lenggeng, Negeri Sembilan and taken to Sungai Petani, Kedah which is more than 400 kilometer away from the suspect's house, after a police report lodged by Sanusi’s special officer, Azizan Hamzah. Two more people were arrested in Mergong Perdana and Kepala Batas after a police report was lodged over the offensive comments made by the two persons on Facebook. An IT analyst from Taiping was the fourth person to be arrested, which prompted the suspect's pregnant wife to comment "I feel that you don’t need to be a MB if you cannot take criticism. Better to just sit down and look through FB comments all day,”. The series of arrests and questioning of citizens for their criticisms of a publicly elected official drew sharp rebukes and criticism from the Malaysian public, Centre for Independent Journalism, opposition politicians and a Federal Minister from the ruling government.

Termination of 4-D lottery license renewal 
In November 2021, Sanusi had spark another controversy by announcing a stop renewing licenses of all of the 4D in Kedah during a press conference. Sanusi states "This move is to ensure that Kedah will be free from gambling." and he also mocked Penang state by stating "Those who want to buy (4-D lottery numbers) can go to Penang".

Election results

Honours 

  :
  Knight Grand Commander of the Exalted Order of the Crown of Kedah (SPMK) – Dato' Seri (2021)

References

External links 

 Muhammad Sanusi Md Nor on Facebook
 Muhammad Sanusi Md Nor on Twitter

1974 births
Living people
Malaysian Muslims
Malaysian people of Malay descent
Malaysian Islamic Party politicians
21st-century Malaysian politicians